Benjamin L. Ginsberg (born c. 1952) is an American lawyer.  He is most well known for his work representing the Republican Party and its political campaigns, candidates, members of Congress and state legislatures and governors, as well as corporations, trade associations, businesses, and individuals participating in the political process.

Before his August 2020 retirement, he was a partner at Jones Day. Prior to that, he worked at Patton Boggs, LLP.

Early life, education and journalism work
Ginsberg was raised in a Jewish family and received his bachelor's degree from the University of Pennsylvania in 1974. While at Penn, he was involved in the school's newspaper, The Daily Pennsylvanian, where he served as a reporter (1970–72), contributing editor (1972) and editor-in-chief (1973).

After college he spent five years as a newspaper reporter for The Boston Globe, Philadelphia Bulletin, The Berkshire Eagle, and The Press-Enterprise.

Ginsburg received his Juris Doctor from Georgetown University in 1982. While in law school, he worked in the Capitol Hill office of Representative George Brown Jr. (D-CA).

Legal career
Ginsberg joined Patton Boggs in 1993 after serving for eight years as counsel to the Republican National Committee, the National Republican Senatorial Committee, and the National Republican Congressional Committee.

In the 2000 and 2004 election cycles, Ginsberg served as national counsel to the Bush-Cheney presidential campaign. In 2000, he played a central role in the Florida recount. He also represents the campaigns and leadership PACs of numerous members of the Senate and House, as well as the Republican National Committee, National Republican Senatorial Committee and National Republican Congressional Committee. He serves as counsel to the Republican Governors Association and has wide experience on the state legislative level from directing Republican redistricting efforts nationwide following the 1990 Census and being actively engaged in the 2001-2002 round of redistricting.  In Jay Roach's Recount (about the 2000 election), Ginsberg is played by Bob Balaban.

In 2004, Ginsberg gave legal advice to the controversial 527 Group Swift Boat Veterans for Truth. Though his simultaneous activities with the "Swifties" and the 2004 Bush Campaign could be considered questionable, his activities were not illegal. Nonetheless, Ginsberg resigned as legal counsel from the Bush Campaign after his position was made public.

Ginsberg appears frequently on television commenting on law and politics.  He is an MSNBC political analyst. He also sits on the Advisory Committee of the Election Law Program at William & Mary Law School.

He is a former Resident Fellow at the Harvard Institute of Politics at Harvard Kennedy School.

In November 2011, Ginsberg was included on The New Republics list of Washington's most powerful, least famous people.

Ginsberg served as National Counsel to Mitt Romney's Presidential campaign in 2008 and in 2012. In August 2012, Politico reported that "Ginsberg has handled the campaign's most sensitive legal matters... and would be the most obvious choice for White House counsel" in a potential Romney cabinet.

In 2013, Ginsberg was a signatory to an amicus curiae brief submitted to the Supreme Court in support of same-sex marriage during the Hollingsworth v. Perry case.

President Barack Obama chose Ginsberg and Robert Bauer, a Democrat, in 2013 to co-chair the Presidential Commission on Election Administration, a yearlong investigation into voting problems. Their findings, "The American Voting Experience: Report and Recommendations of the Presidential Commission on Election Administration," were published in 2014.

In September 2020, The Washington Post published an op-ed by Ginsberg that criticized President Donald Trump for encouraging supporters to commit voter fraud and for making false statements claiming fraud was widespread when it is not. Ginsberg wrote, "The truth is that after decades of looking for illegal voting, there's no proof of widespread fraud. At most, there are isolated incidents — by both Democrats and Republicans. Elections are not rigged. Absentee ballots use the same process as mail-in ballots — different states use different labels for the same process."

In June 2022, he was scheduled to testify at the second public hearing of the January 6 House committee about Donald Trump's failed 2020 election lawsuits.

References

External links
Profile on Patton Boggs website
Profile on Harvard University's Institute of Politics website

1952 births
American lawyers
Georgetown University Law Center alumni
Harvard Fellows
Living people
People associated with the 2000 United States presidential election
University of Pennsylvania alumni
Jewish American attorneys
The Daily Pennsylvanian people
Jones Day people
Pennsylvania Republicans
21st-century American Jews